The Kerian River, alternately Krian, is a river in the northern part of the Malaysian state of Perak. The river originates from the Bintang Range. It flows westerly and discharges into the Strait of Malacca. The main tributaries are the Selama River, Ijok River, Samagagah River and Ulu Mengkuang River.

Settlements
The Kerian River flows through the town of Parit Buntar, Perak, Nibong Tebal, Penang and Bandar Baharu, Kedah.

Incidents
 March 2015 – Thousand of catfish and mayong fish were found dead at Kampung Jajar, Jalan Trans Kerian. The reason of the incidents are yet to be investigated.

See also
 List of rivers of Malaysia

References

Rivers of Kedah
Rivers of Penang
Rivers of Perak
Rivers of Malaysia